Montford Montgomery Cross (August 31, 1869 – June 21, 1934) was an American Major League Baseball player.

Baseball career

Cross played most of his career in Philadelphia, where he was the starting shortstop for the Philadelphia Phillies from  until . At that point, he jumped to the new American League and the crosstown Philadelphia Athletics. He was their starting shortstop from  until , including the 1902 team that won the AL pennant in the year before the World Series began play.

After batting .266 in his part-time role, Cross regained the starting role in  when Knight was moved to third base to replace Lave Cross.

His major league career ended that season, but Monte Cross remained in the industry, playing in three minor leagues from 1908 to 1911. He umpired in the Federal League for 141 games in the 1914 season. In 1915, Cross played semiprofessionally for the Media, Pennsylvania, team in the Delaware County League at age 46.

College baseball
Cross coached the Maine Black Bears baseball team from 1916–1921, the longest tenure of any coach to that point in the program's history. In his six seasons, Maine had a record of 33-33-3. An April 1916 article in the Lewiston Daily Sun said of Cross, "His easy-going, but nevertheless strict instructions and discipline, together with the knowledge of the inside features of the National game, and the manner in which he teaches them, make an everlasting impression on the students, players, and managers."

Head coaching record
Below is a table of Cross's yearly records as a collegiate head baseball coach.

References

External links

, or Retrosheet

1869 births
1934 deaths
19th-century baseball players
Major League Baseball shortstops
Baltimore Orioles (NL) players
Pittsburgh Pirates players
St. Louis Cardinals players
Philadelphia Phillies players
Philadelphia Athletics players
Minor league baseball managers
Kansas City Blues (baseball) managers
Kansas City Blues (baseball) players
Indianapolis Indians players
Baltimore Orioles (IL) players
Scranton Miners players
Maine Black Bears baseball coaches
Baseball players from Philadelphia
Lebanon Cedars players